Rahimabad-e Yek (also Romanized as Raḩīmābād-e Yek, meaning "Rahimabad 1"; also known as Ebrāhīmābād and Chenār Khosrow) is a village in Dowreh Rural District, Chegeni District, Dowreh County, Lorestan Province, Iran. At the 2006 census, its population was 121, in 23 families.

References 

Towns and villages in Dowreh County